Atma Ram (12 October 1908 – 6 February 1983) was an Indian scientist. In his memory, the Atmaram Award is given by the Central Institute of Hindi, an autonomous institute run by the Ministry of Human Resource Development of the Government of India. He was the Director of Central Glass and Ceramic Research Institute and assumed the post of Director General of Council of Scientific and Industrial Research on 21 August 1966. He was also Principal Advisor to Prime Minister and Union Cabinet on Science and Technology from 1977 to 1983.

The Government of India honoured him in 1959, with the award of Padma Shri, the fourth highest Indian civilian award for his contributions.

Dr. Atma Ram was born in Pilana village, Chandpur in Bijnor, Uttar Pradesh. His father name was Lala Bhagwandas.

Education  
 B. SC, Kanpur
 M.Sc., Allahabad
 Ph.D., Allahabad

Honours and awards  
 Shanti Swarup Bhatnagar Award (1959)
 Plaque of Honour, All India Glass Manufacturers Federation (1964)
 Padma Shri (1959)

See also  

 List of Indian scientists

References 

Other citations
 Indian Scientist (Google Books; Writer-Krishnamurari Lal Srivastava; page 188)

External links  
Dr. Atmaram, founder of glass technology in India (India Water Portal)
A Great Indian Scientist- Dr. Atma Ram 
Dr. AtmaRam - A Personal Tribute

1908 births
1983 deaths
People from Uttar Pradesh
Fellows of the Indian National Science Academy
Scientists from Uttar Pradesh
People from Bijnor district
Recipients of the Padma Shri in trade and industry
People from Bijnor